Przeor Kordecki – obrońca Częstochowy is a Polish historical film. It was released in 1934.

References

External links
 

1934 films
Polish historical drama films
1930s Polish-language films
Polish black-and-white films
1930s historical drama films
1930s war drama films
Polish war drama films
1934 drama films